When Men Are Tempted is a 1917 American silent drama film directed by William Wolbert and starring Mary Anderson, Gayne Whitman and Robert N. Bradbury.

Plot

Cast
 Mary Anderson as Jessie Garden
 Gayne Whitman as John Burt 
 Robert N. Bradbury as Peter Burt 
 Otto Lederer as General Garden
 S.E. Jennings as Kinsley

References

Bibliography
 John T. Weaver. Twenty Years of Silents, 1908-1928. Scarecrow Press, 1971.

External links
 

1917 films
1917 drama films
1910s English-language films
American silent feature films
Silent American drama films
American black-and-white films
Vitagraph Studios films
Films directed by William Wolbert
Films with screenplays by George H. Plympton
1910s American films